I Call Fives is a pop punk band from Washington Township, New Jersey. Since their formation in 2006, the band had released 4 EP's and 1 self-titled full length in July 2012 through Pure Noise Records. The band was previously signed to No Sleep Records.  The band was a part of the Vans Warped Tour in 2012 and has played shows in the United States, Canada, England, Ireland, Scotland, and Australia. Their debut full length premiered at #13 on Billboard Charts Top Heatseekers. In 2014, the band performed at Australia's annual music festival, Soundwave (Australian music festival).

Band members

Final Lineup
 Jeff Todd - vocals (2009-present)
 Drew Conte - bass guitar, vocals (2006–present)
 Chris McClelland - guitar (2010–2014)
 Mike Joffe - guitar (2011–present)
Past Members
 Dan "Soupy" Campbell - vocals  (2014)  
 James Corbi - vocals  (2006–2009) 
 Steve Cohen - drums  (2010, 2012)
 Michael Gavarone - guitar  (2006-2011)
 Anthony Plata - guitar  (2006–2010)
 Christian Mullen - drums  (2007, 2009-2010, 2011)

Discography

EP's
2008: First Things First
2010: Bad Advice
2010: Gives Bad Advice (Acoustic EP)
2012: Someone That's Not You

Split 7"
2011: I Call Fives/Rust Belt Lights

Studio Albums
2012: I Call Fives

Compilations
2012: Warped Tour 2012 Tour Compilation
"Backup Plan"

Music videos
 "Late Nights" (2012)

References

External links
 
 
 
 
 

Pop punk groups from New Jersey
Pure Noise Records artists
No Sleep Records artists